The 2009 Telstra Australian Swimming Championships were held in Sydney, New South Wales, Australia from 17–22 March 2009. They doubled as the national trials for the 2009 World Aquatics Championships.

Results

See also
 2009 in swimming

References
 

S
Australian
Australian Swimming Championships
Sports competitions in Sydney
2000s in Sydney